WAUR (1550 kHz) is an AM radio station licensed to Somonauk, Illinois. The station is owned and operated by Nelson Multimedia Inc., and currently airs a classic hits format. Additional programming includes local news, high school sports, a weekly fishing and outdoor program, and NASCAR racing.

The studios are located on Washington Street in downtown Morris, the station's original community of license. Previous studio locations include above the old downtown Hornsby's Five and Dime store on Liberty St. In 1977, the studios moved to the 3rd floor of the Baum Building and later to the Business and Technology Center on North Rt. 47 in Morris. WAUR's current sister station is WJDK-FM (95.7) with studios in the same building and a transmitter located between Kinsman and Seneca, Illinois.

Prior to adopting its current classic hits programming, the then-WCSJ had carried Timeless network programming from Citadel Broadcasting until the network's shutdown in February 2010.

External links
WAUR's website

AUR (AM)
Grundy County, Illinois
Radio stations established in 1964
1964 establishments in Illinois